Miss Universe República Dominicana 1999 was held on June 2, 1998. There were 32 candidates, representing provinces and municipalities, who entered. The winner would represent the Dominican Republic at Miss Universe 1999 and Miss World 1999. The Miss Internacional Dominicana would enter Miss International 1999. The first runner up would enter in Reinado Internacional del Café 1999. The second runner up would enter in Reina Mundial del Banano 1999. The third runner up would enter in Miss Atlantico 1999. The rest of the finalists entered different pageants. This edition would be the first edition to select Top 15 quarter finalist in the history of Miss Dominican Republic.

Results

Delegates

External links
Search Miss Republica Dominicana 1999

Miss Dominican Republic
1999 beauty pageants
1999 in the Dominican Republic